|}
{| class="collapsible collapsed" cellpadding="0" cellspacing="0" style="clear:right; float:right; text-align:center; font-weight:bold;" width="280px"
! colspan="3" style="border:1px solid black; background-color: #77DD77;" | Also Ran

The 1993 Epsom Derby was a horse race which took place at Epsom Downs on Wednesday 2 June 1993. It was the 214th running of the Derby, and it was won by Commander in Chief. The winner was ridden by Michael Kinane and trained by Henry Cecil. The pre-race favourite Tenby finished tenth.

Race details
 Sponsor: Ever Ready
 Winner's prize money: £447,580
 Going: Good
 Number of runners: 16
 Winner's time: 2m 34.51s

Full result

* The distances between the horses are shown in lengths or shorter. shd = short-head; nk = neck.† Trainers are based in Great Britain unless indicated.

Winner's details
Further details of the winner, Commander in Chief:

 Foaled: 18 May 1990 in Great Britain
 Sire: Dancing Brave; Dam: Slightly Dangerous (Roberto)
 Owner: Khalid Abdullah
 Breeder: Juddmonte Farms
 Rating in 1993 International Classifications: 127

Form analysis

Two-year-old races
Notable runs by the future Derby participants as two-year-olds in 1992.

 Blues Traveller – 8th Dewhurst Stakes
 Bob's Return – 1st Zetland Stakes
 Redenham – 7th Racing Post Trophy
 Fatherland – 1st Tyros Stakes, 1st Futurity Stakes, 1st National Stakes, 5th Dewhurst Stakes
 Tenby – 1st Washington Singer Stakes, 1st Grand Critérium
 Desert Team – 2nd Eyrefield Stakes
 Planetary Aspect – 5th Royal Lodge Stakes
 Geisway – 5th Coventry Stakes, 4th Superlative Stakes, 2nd Royal Lodge Stakes
 Canaska Star – 6th Coventry Stakes, 2nd July Stakes, 2nd Richmond Stakes, 4th Prix de la Salamandre, 7th Grand Critérium
 Zind – 7th Dewhurst Stakes, 3rd Racing Post Trophy

The road to Epsom
Early-season appearances in 1993 and trial races prior to running in the Derby.

 Commander in Chief – 1st Glasgow Stakes, 1st Culford Stakes (1m4f cond race Nmkt 2000 guineas day Oakmead 2nd.)
 Blue Judge - 3rd Culford Stakes
 Blues Traveller – 4th Thirsk Classic Trial, 2nd Dee Stakes
 Cairo Prince – 4th Chester Vase
 Barathea – 4th Craven Stakes, 2nd 2,000 Guineas, 1st Irish 2,000 Guineas
 Bob's Return – 1st Lingfield Derby Trial
 Redenham – 8th Craven Stakes, 4th Sandown Classic Trial
 Fatherland – 2nd Leopardstown 2,000 Guineas Trial Stakes, 2nd Irish 2,000 Guineas
 Tenby – 1st Newmarket Stakes, 1st Dante Stakes
 Desert Team – 2nd Feilden Stakes, 3rd Newmarket Stakes
 Planetary Aspect – 2nd Newmarket Stakes, 2nd Dante Stakes
 Geisway – 1st Predominate Stakes
 Canaska Star – 9th Craven Stakes, 5th Predominate Stakes
 Shareek – 3rd Lingfield Derby Trial
 Zind – 2nd White Rose Stakes, 6th Lingfield Derby Trial

Subsequent Group 1 wins
Group 1 / Grade I victories after running in the Derby.

 Commander in Chief – Irish Derby (1993)
 Barathea – Breeders' Cup Mile (1994)
 Bob's Return – St. Leger (1993)

Subsequent breeding careers
Leading progeny of participants in the 1993 Epsom Derby.

Sires of Group/Grade One winners
Barathea (5th)
 Tobougg - Champion Two-year-old Colt (2000), 3rd Epsom Derby (2001)
 Tante Rose - 1st Haydock Sprint Cup (2004)
 Magical Romance  - 1st Cheveley Park Stakes (2004)
 Overturn - 1st Fighting Fifth Hurdle (2011)
Blues Traveller (3rd) - Exported to New Zealand before finishing stud career in Ireland
 Giovana - 1st Queensland Oaks (2000)
 Bohemian Blues - Dam of Shamrocker (1st Australian Guineas 2011) and Rock Diva (1st Auckland Cup 2015)

Sires of National Hunt horses
Bob's Return (6th)
 Joncol - 1st John Durkan Memorial Punchestown Chase (2009), 1st Hennessy Gold Cup (2010)
 Oneway - 3rd Tingle Creek Chase (2005,2006)
 Across The Bay - 1st Rendlesham Hurdle (2013)
 Annalecky - Dam of Black Hercules (1st Golden Miller Novices' Chase 2016)

Other Stallions
Commander In Chief (1st) - Ein Bride (1st Hanshin Sansai Himba Stakes 1997), Rascal Suzuka (2nd Tenno Sho 2000), Damsire of Little Amapola (Champion Japanese Three-Year-Old Filly 2008)Tenby (10th) - Sun Zeppelin (2nd Satsuki Shō 2007), Carry The Flag (3rd Singapore Airlines International Cup 2000), Mirjan (1st Northumberland Plate 2004)Blue Judge (2nd) - Exported to Saudi ArabiaWolf Prince (8th) - Exported to AmericaDesert Team (11th) - Exported to South AfricaPlanetary Aspect (12th) - Exported to Saudi Arabia

References

External links
 Colour Chart – Derby 1993

Epsom Derby
 1993
Epsom Derby
20th century in Surrey
Epsom Derby